The Philippine mottled eel (Anguilla luzonensis) is an eel in the family Anguillidae. It was described by Shun Watanabe, Jun Aoyama, and Katsumi Tsukamoto in 2009. It is a tropical eel known from the Pinacanauan River system on Luzon Island (from which the species epithet is derived), in the Philippines. The eels spend most of their lives in freshwater but migrate to the ocean to breed.

References

Anguillidae
Fish described in 2009
Near threatened animals
Endemic fauna of the Philippines
Fauna of Luzon